Las Vegas Little Theater is a community theater in Las Vegas, Nevada that was founded in 1978 by Jack Bell and Jack Nickolson. Acting classes are available.  It is the oldest operating small theater in the valley.

Notes

External links
Las Vegas Little Theater

Community theatre
Theatres in Nevada
Arts organizations established in 1978
Culture of Las Vegas
Tourist attractions in the Las Vegas Valley
1978 establishments in Nevada